Fleury Mesplet (January 10, 1734 – January 24, 1794) was a French-born Canadian printer best known for founding the Montreal Gazette, Quebec's oldest daily newspaper, in 1778.

Biography 
Mesplet was born in Marseille, France, and was apprenticed as a printer in Lyon. He emigrated to London in 1773 where he set up shop in Covent Garden.

In 1774 he emigrated to Philadelphia; it is thought that he may have been persuaded to do so by Benjamin Franklin. In Philadelphia he again went into business as a printer, but received little work; he printed the Lettre adressée aux habitants de la province de Québec, ci-devant le Canada (Letter to the Inhabitants of Canada) for the Continental Congress in 1775, and travelled to Montreal the following year to set up a printing press in the newly captured city.

As the Americans withdrew from Montreal, he was arrested and imprisoned, but released later in the year; however, he managed to publish several works in 1776.

In 1778 he founded the Gazette Littéraire de Montréal, edited by Valentin Jautard. Both were arrested in 1779 for sedition, and imprisoned for three years; on his release, Mesplet was $5,000 in debt but quickly dealt with his creditors,. In 1785, published La Gazette de Montréal, now the Montreal Gazette, the successor to the suspended Gazette Littéraire.

In total, he published some seventy or eighty works, in French, English, Latin, and Iroquois; ten of these ran to more than a hundred pages, and another seven were almanacs.

References

Further reading
 Brunet, Michel (1951). Les Idées politiques de la Gazette littéraire de Montréal (1778-1779), 8 p.
 Derome, Robert, Bernard Andrès, Marc-André Bernier, and Yvan Lamonde. "The Publications of Mesplet and du Calvet", in the site Images from the Turn of a Century 1760-1840. A Portrait of Arts, Literature and Eloquence in Québec, 2000 (was also an exhibition presented at the Château Ramezay Museum between January 27 and May 28, 2000)
 Fauteux, Aegidius (1934). Fleury Mesplet; une étude sur les commencements de l'imprimerie dans la ville de Montréal, United States, s.n, 35 p. (online)
 , in the site of 'ALAQ, 2002
 Lagrave, Jean-Paul de & Ruelland, Jacques G. (2001). L'imprimeur des Libertés : Fleury Mesplet (1734-1794) : roman historique, Montréal: Éditions Point de Fuite, 391 p. 
 Lagrave, Jean-Paul de (1994). L'Époque de Voltaire au Canada: biographie politique de Fleury Mesplet, imprimeur, Montreal: L'Étincelle éditeur, 502 p.
 Lagrave, Jean-Paul de (1985). Fleury Mesplet, 1734-1794 : diffuseur des Lumières au Québec, Montréal : Patenaude, 503 p.
 McLachlan, Robert Wallace (1906). Fleury Mesplet, the First Printer at Montreal, Ottawa: Royal Society of Canada, 113 p. (online)
 Morin, Victor (1939). Fleury Mesplets, pionnier de l'imprimerie à Montréal : causerie faite au dîner annuel des Maîtres imprimeurs de Montréal le 19 avril 1939, Montreal: Compagnie de papier Rolland limitée, 30 p.
 Trudel, Marcel (1945). L'influence de Voltaire au Canada, Tome I: de 1760 à 1850, Montréal: Publications de l'Université Laval, Fidès, 1945.

1734 births
1794 deaths
Canadian printers
Businesspeople from Lyon
French emigrants to pre-Confederation Quebec
Businesspeople from Marseille
Canadian newspaper founders
18th-century Canadian newspaper publishers (people)
Montreal Gazette publishers (people)
Immigrants to the Province of Quebec (1763–1791)